Chris LaMont is a screenwriter, independent filmmaker, and film professor, who co-founded the Phoenix Film Festival in 2000. He has written and co-written several feature films, including The Inheritance ', The Locksmith, The Au Pair Nightmare, and Hard Kill. He has also produced and directed several independent films, including Film Club, My Apocalypse, Netherbeast Incorporated, The Graves, Justice Served and Postmarked.

Early life
Born in Edison, New Jersey and growing up in Phoenix, Arizona, LaMont graduated magna cum laude from Arizona State University. While there, he won an Emmy Award for Student Entertainment Production for the sketch comedy series, TV or Not TV.  He directed his first feature with Steve Bencich, The Best Movie Ever Made featuring Adam West. His next feature, Writer’s Block, was released to video stores, and the horror-thriller earned critic and fan praise, including a 3½ star rating in the Blockbuster Video Guide. 

Career
In 2000, he directed and co-wrote Film Club, a short film parody of David Fincher’s Fight Club. It was included on the George Lucas in Love DVD, one of the biggest short film compilation releases in history. The film was featured on CNN Headline News and MSNBC.com.  Later, he directed the documentary feature 14 Days in America, and in 2006 he produced with Brian and Dean Ronalds the office-vampire comedy Netherbeast Incorporated, which was released in North America on DVD in January 2009 by Illuminata Films.

In 2008, he also produced the animated logos for "R&D TV" for writer/director Jerry Hultsch that appear on the end of the Season 4 episodes of SyFy Channel's Battlestar Galactica. His film My Apocalypse was a dark comedy/drama, which had its world premier at the 2008 Boston Underground Film Festival. It has also screened as an Official Selection at the Sydney Underground Film Festival, Strasbourg (France) International Film Festival, New Jersey Film Festival, Arizona International Film Festival, and the River's Edge Independent Film Festival during 2008.

In 2009 he produced the film The Graves for first-time feature filmmaker, writer-director Brian Pulido, with the Ronalds Brothers. Starring Claire Grant, Jillian Murray, Bill Mosely and Tony Todd, the supernatural suspense genre film follows two sisters who are captured in an old ghost town controlled by a religious zealot and his brainwashed clan. The film was released in 2010 by AfterDark Films as one of the "Horrorfest 2010: Eight Films To Die For".

In 2014, he produced the independent suspense-thriller Justice Served, with writer-director Marvin Young, starring Chase Coleman, Lochlyn Munro, Gail O' Grady and Lance Henriksen. In 2015 he produced the micro-budget feature "Postmarked" for writer-director Gene Ganssle.

In 2015, he started to focus on screenplay writing. He and his writing partner Joseph Russo were named to the 2016 Young and Hungry List, the annual listing of the Top 100 New Screenwriters in Hollywood from The Tracking Board. Their feature screenplay "Road Rage" was a finalist in the largest screenplay competition in the world, the annual Final Draft Big Break Contest. Their screenplay, "Soul Mates", was named to The Blood List as one of the Top 13 unproduced genre films in Hollywood and to The Hit List as one of the Top Unproduced Screenplays in Hollywood. Their horror action film "The Red Pill" was named to the 2017 Blood List and their horror screenplay "The Last Will and Testament of Charles Abernathy" was named on the 2018 Blood List. They are the first screenwriters to have been named to the list three times in a row.

2019 saw their script "The Au Pair Nightmare" filmed in New Mexico with Joe Russo directing. The film premiered on the Lifetime Network with over 600,000 viewers and was the #2 original movie of the night. In Spring 2020, the pair's action-thriller "Hard Kill" starring Bruce Willis and Jesse Metcalf was directed by Matt Eskardi and shot in Cincinnati. The film is being released from Vertical Entertainment on August 28, 2020 theatrically and on VOD.

In 2020, the pair sold their award-winning screenplay "The Last Will and Testament of Charles Abernathy" to Netflix and the film is pending release. In 2021, they wrote a draft of the suspense-thriller "The Locksmith" starring Ryan Phillippe, Kate Bosworth and Ving Rhames. The film was released in 2023 on VOD. 
In 2022, their award-winning screenplay "Soul Mates" was independently produced with a release planned for 2023. They currently have several projects in various stages of development. 

Organization work
In 2000, LaMont co-founded the Phoenix Film Festival, which had over 23,000 attendees in 2013.  In past years, actors and directors including Tom Arnold, Kevin Bacon, Alan Cumming, Laurence Fishburne, Peter Fonda, Robert Forster, John Landis, Kyra Sedgwick, Jane Seymour, and John Waters have appeared.  He is the Executive Director of the festival, and president of the non-profit Phoenix Film Foundation, which he also co-founded.  In 2002, he started the Phoenix Film Project, an independent filmmaker community group, which has officially changed to IFP-Phoenix, and started the Phoenix Film Society in 2004.

With comic book writer Brian Pulido, he co-founded and is the Executive Director of the International Horror and Sci-Fi Film Festival.  The festival attracted over 4,000 attendees in 2006 and has featured such celebrities as Mick Garris, Tobe Hooper, Nightmare on Elm Street's Heather Langenkamp, and Star Wars’ Chewbacca Peter Mayhew.  In 2007, he founded the Arizona Student Film Festival to encourage young statewide filmmakers. In 2011, the International Horror and Sci-Fi Film Festival became the late night programming arm of the Phoenix Film Festival.

Teaching
LaMont has taught at Arizona State University since 2004 in the ASU Sidney Poitier New American Film School - such courses as Film: The Creative Process, Intermediate Screenwriting, Producing for Film & Media, Careers in Media Industry and created two popular online classes: Great Comedy Films and Alfred Hitchcock.

Filmography
ProducerThe Best Movie Ever Made (1994) ...aka The Battle for the Planet of CheeseWriter's Block (1995) ...aka Writer's Block: Truth or Dare 2 (United States: video box title)Paychecked! (short) (2006)Screen Wars - Phoenix TV Series (2005 - 2007)Netherbeast Incorporated (2006)My Apocalypse (2008)The Graves (2009)Justice Served (2015)Postmarked (2016)Postmarked (2018)

DirectorThe Best Movie Ever Made (1994)Writer's Block (1995)Film Club (2000)14 Days in America (2005)Paychecked! (2006)My Apocalypse (2008)

WriterThe Best Movie Ever Made (1994)Writer's Block (1995/I)Film Club (2000)Mating Rituals (2004)Paychecked! (2006)My Apocalypse (aka Quality Time) (2008)Take Out (short) (2009)Who's There? (short) (2016)Be Mine (short) (2017)The Au Pair Nightmare (2020)Hard Kill (2020)The Last Will and Testament of Charles Abernathy (TBA)The Locksmith (2023) Soul Mates''(TBA)

References

External links
Official Website

American filmmakers
Arizona State University alumni
American male screenwriters
Screenwriting instructors
Living people
Year of birth missing (living people)